The Brook is a private club located at 111 East 54th Street in Manhattan inNew York City. 

It was founded in 1903 by a group of prominent men who belonged to other New York City private clubs, such as the Knickerbocker Club and the Union Club. The name is derived from the Alfred Lord Tennyson poem The Brook, whose lines "For men may come and men may go, but I go on for ever" were consistent with the intention that the Club would provide 24-hour service and would never close its doors. In 1992, the City Journal wrote that the name was "supposed to mean that the Club is always open and the conversation flows on forever," but that "neither is strictly true." One version of the club's origin holds that The Brook was formed by two young men who had been expelled from the Union Club for trying to poach an egg on the bald head of another club member.

When the club was formed, it was announced that membership was only by private invitation and would be limited to 100 men. New York City residents who were not club members would not be admitted as guests. Membership, however, was not restricted to New York City residents—some original members came from Boston, Chicago, and Philadelphia.

In 1954 the membership was 400 men. The Club's building, erected in 1925, was designed by the architecture firm of Delano & Aldrich, which also designed the houses of the Union Club, the Knickerbocker, and other exclusive clubs.

Notable members, past and present
 John Jacob Astor IV, richest man in America at the time – died in the Titanic
 Michael R. Bloomberg, resigned his membership before becoming a candidate for Mayor of New York before later becoming a member again in 2011.
 William A. Chanler, explorer, soldier and US Congressman
 Michel David-Weill, French investment banker and former Senior Partner of Lazard Frères
 Admiral James L. Holloway III
 Henry Kissinger, former Secretary of State
 Alejandro Santo Domingo, billionaire financier
 William K. Vanderbilt II
 Jerauld Wright

Other
 Fred Astaire, wore a Brook Club hatband in the 1953 film The Band Wagon
 John Hay Whitney, visited The Brook and was treated as a member, but he was never actually a member of the club.

See also

 List of American gentlemen's clubs

References 

Midtown Manhattan
1903 establishments in New York City
Delano & Aldrich buildings
Gentlemen's clubs in New York City